Sara Lüscher (born 1986) is a Swiss orienteering competitor. She competed at the 2013 World Orienteering Championships, and won a bronze medal in the relay with the Swiss team, behind Norway and Finland. The next year  she won gold in the relay with Sabine Hauswirth and Judith Wyder. She runs for Kalevan Rasti in club competitions.

References

External links

1986 births
Living people
Swiss orienteers
Female orienteers
Foot orienteers
World Orienteering Championships medalists
World Games gold medalists

Competitors at the 2013 World Games
World Games medalists in orienteering
21st-century Swiss women